Events in the year 1861 in Costa Rica.

Incumbents
President: José María Montealegre

Events

Births
April 18 - Rafael Yglesias Castro, President 1894-1902 (d. 1924)

References

1860s in Costa Rica